St. Ignatius of Loyola College, Caracas, (Colegio San Ignacio de Loyola) is a private Catholic primary and secondary school located in Caracas, Venezuela Founded by the Jesuits in 1923, the school is coeducational, and covers pre-primary through high school.

History
Ignatius College was founded in 1923 with the encouragement of the Catholic Archbishop. In 1940 the college received a new building. In the early 1950s it moved to Chacao at Av. Sta Teresa de Jesus, its present location.

See also
 List of Jesuit schools

References  

Educational institutions established in 1923
Jesuit schools in Venezuela
1923 establishments in Venezuela
Schools in Caracas